Yuki Bhambri was the Traralgon Champion from 2013, but he did not compete that year, while Bradley Klahn was current Traralgon Champion, having won the first of two challengers held in this place in 2014, but he lost to Benjamin Mitchell in the first round.
John Millman won the title, defeating James Ward in the final, 6–4, 6–1.

Seeds

Draw

Finals

Top half

Bottom half

References
  Main Draw
 Qualifying Draw

Latrobe City Traralgon ATP Challenger 2 - Singles
2014 Singles
Latrobe City Traralgon ATP Challenger 2 - Singles